2012 Uzbekistan Futsal League

Uzbekistan Futsal League 2012 standings

References
 
 

Futsal in Uzbekistan